Turn It Around may refer to:

Turn It Around!, a 1987 punk rock compilation album
"Turn It Around" (Alena song), a 1998 song by Alena
Turn It Around (Comeback Kid album), a 2003 album by Comeback Kid
"Turn It Around" (song), a 2013 song by Sub Focus, featuring the vocals of Kele Okereke
Turn It Around: The Story of East Bay Punk, a 2017 documentary film